Dezerland Park Orlando (formerly known as the Festival Bay and Artegon Marketplace) is an enclosed shopping mall and amusement park located on International Drive in Orlando, Florida, United States. Opened in 2002 as a property of the Belz Factory Outlets, it is owned and managed by Dezer Development. It also comprised several entertainment venues, including a Cinemark movie theater, Sky Zone Trampoline Park, Sky Trail Ropes Course and a Putting Edge glow-in-the-dark miniature golf course. Having failed twice as a shopping mall, the complex reopened in 2020 as Dezerland Park Orlando.

History
The mall was planned and developed by Belz Enterprises. It was originally planned to open in 2000, but the opening was delayed until 2002.

In 2004, plans were announced for a surfing park, named Ron Jon Surfpark, to be built inside the mall. This project was never opened.

In 2011, after acquiring new owners, plans were announced for the mall to be redeveloped. Aside from the main anchors, most of the mall would receive extensive alterations. The signature lake and tile mosaic signs were later on removed from the mall.

In January 2012, Vans Skatepark, one of the mall's anchors, closed. While one of the most popular attractions at the mall, no reason was given for the closure. It is stated that after two years, the mall is expected to reopen most likely as a newly named, open-air complex with shops, entertainment and maybe even hotels.

Festival Bay was re-opened as Artegon Marketplace on November 20, 2014, branding as the Anti-Mall. Artegon Marketplace closed again in January 2017 for redevelopment, except for Bass Pro Shops, Cinemark, and Boot Barn.

In January 2018, it was announced that Dezer Development of Miami purchased the property for $23.7 million which includes 104 acres and the  865,000 square foot mall. The complex was officially reopened in 2021, featuring as one of its main attractions a collection of automobiles and automotive memorabilia.

References

External links
Ron Jon Surf Shop store webpage
Artegon Marketplace website

Buildings and structures in Orlando, Florida
Economy of Orlando, Florida
Shopping malls in Florida
Shopping malls established in 2002
Tourist attractions in Orlando, Florida
2002 establishments in Florida